Shagou Township (Mandarin: 沙沟回族乡) is a township in Ping'an District, Haidong, Qinghai, China. In 2010, Shagou Township had a total population of 7,496: 3,780 males and 3,716 females: 1,728 aged under 14, 5,181 aged between 15 and 65 and 587 aged over 65.

References 

Township-level divisions of Qinghai
Ping'an District
Ethnic townships of the People's Republic of China